Cave Spring High School may refer to:

 Cave Spring Female Academy (Cave Spring, Georgia), listed on the NRHP in Georgia
 Cave Spring High School (Cave Spring, Georgia), listed on the NRHP in Georgia
 Cave Spring High School (Roanoke, Virginia)